The 2011 ITF Men's Circuit is the 2011 edition of the third tier tour for men's professional tennis. It is organised by the International Tennis Federation and is a tier below the ATP Challenger Tour. During the months of April 2011 and June 2011 over 150 tournaments were played with the majority being played in the month of May.

Key

April

May

June

References

 04-06